William Patrick Feldman (born 22 February 1958) is a former Australian politician. Born in Kingaroy, Queensland, Feldman was a police officer before entering politics working close with David Dalgleish, having attained the rank of sergeant in 1994. On 7 May 1978 he had married Gail, with whom he has two children, Dannielle and Luke.

In 1998, he was elected to the Legislative Assembly of Queensland as a member of Pauline Hanson's One Nation, representing the seat of Caboolture. He was the parliamentary leader until December 1999, when he led his remaining colleagues out of One Nation to form the City Country Alliance, of which he became leader. His seat was abolished in 2001 and he contested its replacement, Pumicestone, but was defeated by Labor's Carryn Sullivan, whose husband Jon Sullivan Feldman had defeated in Caboolture in 1998. Feldman did not continue his political career, and instead returned to the police force.

Feldman's son Luke Feldman is a professional cricketer, playing for the Queensland Bulls, Hobart Hurricanes and Sydney Sixers.

References

1958 births
Living people
Australian police officers
One Nation members of the Parliament of Queensland
Members of the Queensland Legislative Assembly
21st-century Australian politicians